Simon Patrick O'Donnell (born 26 January 1963) is an Australian former cricketer, VFL footballer, and horse racing and cricket commentator. He is currently a horse breeder and enabler. He is a former record holder for the fastest One Day International half-century. He was educated at Deniliquin High School and Assumption College.

Cricket
O'Donnell played as an all-rounder for Victoria in the Sheffield Shield between 1984 and 1993, scoring a century in his first match. He went on to play 6 Test matches in 1985, 5 on the Ashes tour of England and one at home, but with a low bowling strike rate in 5 and 4 day cricket, he was more successful in the shorter form of the game.

Seen as a limited-overs specialist with clever medium pace bowling and explosive lower order hitting, he played 87 ODIs between 1985 and 1992, scoring 1242 runs and taking 108 wickets in his career. He played in Australia's 1987 World Cup Final victory and was a significant wicket-taker and finished the World cup as Australia's most economical bowler, but soon after he suffered severe pain that was diagnosed as non-Hodgkin lymphoma.

He recovered with treatment to return to the Australian One-Day team in the 1988–89 season and played 43 more limited-overs matches till 10 December 1991 and claimed 56 wickets and made 5 match winning 50 plus scores including the fastest half-century in One Day Internationals (18 balls v Sri Lanka, Sharjah, 1990, which lasted for 6 years until Sri Lankan Sanath Jayasuriya scored 50 from 17 balls v Pakistan at Singapore on 7 April 1996). O'Donnell maintained a very good batting strike rate of 80.96 runs per 100 balls in ODIs, almost double his scoring rate in Tests.

He was captain of Victoria for five seasons from 1988–89 until his retirement in 1993. This was a mixed period, which included a Sheffield Shield victory in 90–91, but Victoria also finished last in 1988–89, 1989–90 and 1992–93.

O'Donnell was voted international cricketer of the year in 1990–91.

Australian rules football
As a junior, Simon played Australian rules football for Assumption College, Kilmore, where he kicked 100 goals in his senior year. This led to him being recruited for senior football by the St Kilda Football Club, where his father Kevin had played 49 games on a forward flank in the 1940s. Coincidentally, Kevin O'Donnell played alongside two more notable Australian cricketers; Sam Loxton and Keith Miller, members of the 1948 Invincibles.

O'Donnell played 24 games and kicked 18 goals between 1982 and 1983 in what was then the VFL. However, he had continued to play cricket and retired from football to focus on his cricket career.

Media career

O'Donnell hosted Melbourne radio station Sport 927's morning program with Kevin Bartlett until 2004.

With the Nine Network, O'Donnell has been a commentator of cricket and now presents The Cricket Show. Having owned and managed race horses through his company, O'Donnell Thoroughbreds International, he is also used as an expert on horseracing on Nine's racing coverage.

During the mid-1990s as part of his work with Channel 9, O'Donnell was a regular on the daytime program The Midday Show, teaming up with former rugby league footballer Paul "Fatty" Vautin on Fridays to give an overview of the weekends sporting events, usually the AFL and NSWRL competitions, and to give their racing tips. The pair would generally get into silly situations (e.g. coming out onto the set dressed in blowup Sumo suits), or would be on location such as in early 1994 when O'Donnell was taken on some hot laps of the high speed Calder Park Thunderdome oval racetrack in Melbourne with multiple AUSCAR champion Brad Jones.

In November 2011, it was announced that O'Donnell would replace James Brayshaw as host of The Sunday Footy Show. However, In November 2012, Nine announced that O'Donnell had left the network.

Cricket career

1983–84 Season
O'Donnell made his first class debut for Victoria against South Australia at the MCG in February 1984.

1984–85
The following summer his bowling gathered attention when he took the wickets of Kepler Wessels and Alan Border in Victoria vs Qld Shield game, as well as making 54.

An innings of 45 not out helped steer Victoria to victory in a McDonald's Cup game. He made 78 in a run-heavy game against the touring West Indies and hit 42 off 43 balls and 129 against Western Australia.

He was selected in the Prime Ministers XI to play the West Indies. According to a contemporary report, "O'Donnell's selection is a timely one as his name has been cropping up regularly in discussions on Australian teams and it will be no surprise if he is selected to play in the one-day series in the New Year. As well as being a more than useful medium-pace bowler O'Donnell has the potential to be a leading batsman, having scored a hard-hitting century against Western Australia in Perth last week."

In January 1985 O'Donnell was named in the 12 man Australian one day squad. ""I am very delighted", he said. "It will be the biggest thrill of my life to walk out on to the MCG on Sunday. It was my goal at the start of the year to try and make national selection, but I thought that might not come for two or three years."

O'Donnell's one day debut was a successful one, taking 1–39 and scoring 20 not out against Sri Lanka. He scored 25 in a defeat against the West Indies.

In the Prime Ministers XI game he took two wickets but dropped two catches. Kept on in the one day team he took two wickets against Sri Lanka then scored some useful runs in a rare Australian victory over the West Indies.

In the World Championship of Cricket, O'Donnell had a fantastic game against Pakistan, making 74 and taking 2–42. This helped earn O'Donnell selection on the short tour to Sharjah in early 1985. He was also selected on the squad to tour England for the Ashes. "A lot of hard work has been one thing", he said. "The dividends are starting to pay off – they're paying off very quickly", adding that "I've still got to get a Test match over there. There are 17 going, so I've got to get into the top 11."

O'Donnell had only played seven first-class matches, hitting 528 runs at an average of 66, with two centuries, and had taken 15 wickets at an average of 38.23. He was still listed in the St Kilda squad.

1985 Ashes
O'Donnell leapt into test contention with a score of 100 against the MCC. ""That's the greatest innings I've ever played", O'Donnell said, "and walking off the ground to an ovation like that was one of my greatest thrills. I'm absolutely ecstatic."

O'Donnell played in the Australian team for the one day internationals, taking two crucial wickets in the second.

He was picked in Australian side for the first test, as the fourth bowler. He scored 24 and took 3 wickets in England's second innings. England won the game easily.

O'Donnell kept his place in the side for the second test. He proved his usefulness with the bat, helping Australia navigate a tricky second innings run chase and hitting the winning runs with a six.

There was a risk he would be made 12th man for the third test but O'Donnell kept his position. He was made 12th man for the last test.

1985–86
O'Donnell injured his hip at the beginning of the 1985–86 season and missed some early games. He recovered in time to be selected for the first test against New Zealand. He took a career best 2–53 and 5–66 against New South Wales. However fellow all rounder Greg Matthews took 5–22 in the same game and he was preferred to O'Donnell, who was made 12th man.

O'Donnell was kept in the squad and played in the second test against New Zealand. He took part in an important second innings partnership which guided Australia to victory. However he was injured during the test while fielding and was omitted from the third test.

He was out of cricket for a number of weeks. He returned against Tasmania taking 3–48.

1986–87
O'Donnell began the 1986–87 season well with 52 against Tasmania and 108 against NSW. He followed this with 77 against England in a tour game and 86 against West Australia.

He was unable to force his way back into the test team but was selected in Australia's one day squad. Highlights included 4–65 against the West Indies, 52 against the West Indies, 3–39 against England, a man of the match 4–19 against the West Indies, and a match winning 23 off 15 balls against the West Indies. Alan Border said that O'Donnell, Dean Jones and Steve Waugh had been Australia's stand out players of the series.

O'Donnell's good form continued with 86 against Queensland and 73 against South Australia. He made 80 and 78 against WA in the Sheffield Shield final, but Victoria did not win the game.

O'Donnell was selected to play in Australia's one day tour of Sharjah in 1987 and the World Cup.

1987 World Cup and Cancer
Shortly before O'Donnell left for India he discovered, "a lump on my ribs that was sore. I made some doctors do some horrible things to ensure I got to India. I got an X-ray that showed I was missing a rib. The doctor was worried about it, but I was on a plane to India three days later. But two days into India not only did the big lump come back but he had a couple of partners and that's when I thought I was in a bit of strife."

O'Donnell did not go to the team doctor. "I did nothing. Make no mistake, I'm no martyr in all of this, in fact, I was motivated by pure selfishness."

O'Donnell's World Cup highlights include 4–39 against Zimbabwe.

"The team was on a campaign and I didn't want to jeopardize it so I just tried to keep myself up. I had a few talks with Bob [Simpson] and Bruce [Reid] but I didn't tell them what I thought it was. I didn't want to worry anyone because we all had a job to do... and we did the job."

O'Donnell says he told Simpson after Australia won the semi final in Pakistan. "I knew I was within a week of going home to find out what was wrong and it really frightened me... Before the final at our team meeting I was fined by teammates for not being part of celebrations. That was fine. But I needed to tell someone."

O'Donnell went to Warrigal Private Hospital as soon as he got back:
I was operated on that afternoon. As soon as I woke the surgeon, John Bartlett, was sitting on the end of my bed to tell me the bi-op was malignant... [Non-Hodgkin's lymphoma] John found it hard to tell me and I found it hard to accept... I had to ring Mum and Dad in Deniliquin to tell them there was some bad news. Somehow you float through it even though you are scared s—less... The hardest part is the initial part, once you know what's in front of you it gets better. I don't want to trivialise cancer in any way. You have to let the emotion out then sit down and become realistic ... I never asked if my life was in the balance. My parents taught me, my school taught me, sport taught me but in particular cancer taught me that trust is the most powerful emotion we have. I trusted my doctors and nurses implicitly. It was amazing what I learnt about the power of the mind and how important trust is...  There were the "how in the hell did I get it?" moments. No one knows, it could have been getting hit in a footy game or a cricket ball 10 years earlier.
O'Donnell's injury was initially reported as a muscle strain.

"If I didn't need the operation I could go out and bowl 30 overs now", he said at the time. "That's the good thing about it. I feel as strong as a bull." O'Donnell commenced chemotherapy and received the good wishes of Prime Minister Bob Hawke.

Three months later O'Donnell was declared cancer free.

1988–89: Victorian Captain
Simon O'Donnell was appointed Victorian captain at the beginning of the 1988–89 season. He told the press:
It will be a win-at-all costs approach. We're going to go out and give 110 per cent-over four days of every Shield game. If you give 110 per cent, you'll win a lot more games than you lose. I've been 12 months out of the game but if I see a ball I think I can hit, I will hit it... It's a big part of the captaincy so everyone knows where they stand. A happy team turns into a confident team and wins matches. But I have a hell of a lot to learn. It's my first shot at it and I will be listening to a lot of people. People who are willing to give advice and have a bit of a yarn.
O'Donnell's highlights for the summer included 6–54 against NSW.

Victoria performed poorly in the Sheffield Shield that summer, ultimately coming last. O'Donnell's captaincy was often criticised for being over generous in his declarations. "Our Shield program has gone off the rails a bit because we've let ourselves down badly as a team", O'Donnell said. "We've batted well or we've bowled well but we haven't combined the two." However Victoria did make the finals of the one day FAI Cup.

O'Donnell was selected in the Australian one day team that summer. His first game back was a successful one, taking 1–45 and scoring 46 off 54 balls against Pakistan. He was dropped from the side after the first final.

Through the 1989 English summer, O'Donnell played club cricket for Haslingden. He played a game for the Rest of the World against Glamorgan and scored 66 off 23 balls.

He played in the Australian one day team that toured India in late 1989, and had a mediocre tournament with the exception of 3–48 against Sri Lanka.

1989/90
At the beginning of the 1989–90 summer there was some talk that Dean Jones might captain Victoria instead of O'Donnell. However O'Donnell retained the captaincy.

His batting form was better that summer, scoring centuries against the touring Sri Lanka side and Tasmania.

He kept his place in the Australian side for the one day tournament at the end of the summer. He won man of the match against Sri Lanka scoring 57 and taking 4–36. Other highlights of the summer included 3–36 against Sri Lanka.

O'Donnell toured New Zealand with the one day side, taking 5–13 in a game against New Zealand. He later made 52 in another game.

He also toured with Australia on a trip to Sharjah. In a game against Sri Lanka, O'Donnell scored 74 off 29 balls, making his 50 in 18 balls – the fastest one day 50 at that time.

1990–91: International Cricketer of the Year and Sheffield Shield Champions
O'Donnell continued to play strongly for the Australian one-day team throughout the 1990–91 summer. Highlights included 4–45 against England, and 71 against England He over took Dennis Lillee as Australia's leading ODI wicket-taker and there was talk he might go to the West Indies as a limited over specialist. He was not selected but did win the International Cricketer of the Year Award despite playing no tests. He also led Victoria to the Sheffield Shield when they defeated New South Wales in the final. O'Donnell said after the match:
It's definitely the hardest game of cricket I've ever played. The World Cup was difficult, if not more difficult, but you knew it was all going to be over in a day. This just took turn after turn after turn over the four days' duration, plus your rained out day – it was a real tough game of cricket to play for every body.
In 1991 he scored 71 off 45 balls in a one-day game for Victoria against Essex.

1991–92
O'Donnell was selected in Australia's one day side for 1991–92 but had to withdraw due to an dislocated shoulder. He played for Victoria as a batsman only for a few games. Despite his injury he was named in Australia's preliminary 20 man squad for the 1992 World Cup. He suffered a poor run of form, scoring 124 runs at an average of 12 with the bat, and only bowling gently medium pace. He was not picked for the final 14 man World Cup squad.

O'Donnell responded with a quickfire 87 against South Australia for Victoria. Australia struggled during the World Cup, failing to make the semi finals, and Alan Border later wondered if omitting O'Donnell was a mistake.

"It's a real shame that he just couldn't get it together when the selectors were sitting down", Border said. "To me he's done a fantastic job for us... It was a difficult one, wasn't it? His form was ordinary and we weren't exactly sure how he was going to come up bowling."

1992–93
O'Donnell was reappointed Victorian captain for the 1992–93 season. He earned selection in the Prime Ministers XI. Victoria struggled that summer and O'Donnell's captaincy came under criticism for lack of imagination and aggression. There was some talk his job was in danger. O'Donnell:

"I agree where there's smoke there's fire, and comments like that aren't made unless they come from a pretty reliable source. I suppose the next step is to try and find out where they come from and talk to the person that makes them, because if there's anything that's got to be said I'd prefer it was said to me. That hasn't happened as yet, but we'll see what happens in the next 24 hours."

Victorian officials said that O'Donnell had their support. Victoria did make the final of the domestic one day tournament that year but performed poorly in the Sheffield Shield and O'Donnell began to seriously reconsider his future.

In July 1993 O'Donnell resigned as captain of Victoria.

References

External links

 Simon O'Donnell's ODI Howstat statistics
Brydon Coverdale, "Australia's Winter Allrounders: XI Test Cricketers who played Australian Rules football at the highest level", Cricinfo, 28 May 2007
Nine network's Cricket Show
Website for OTI Racing, O'Donnell's company

1963 births
Living people
Australian cricketers
Australia Test cricketers
Australia One Day International cricketers
Australian cricket commentators
Victoria cricketers
Northumberland cricketers
Cricketers at the 1987 Cricket World Cup
Cricketers from New South Wales
Australian rules footballers from New South Wales
St Kilda Football Club players
People from Deniliquin
M Parkinson's World XI cricketers